The Alishan Post Office is a post office in Zhongzheng Village, Alishan Township, Chiayi County, Taiwan.

Geography
At an elevation of 2,274 meters above sea level, the building is the highest post office in Taiwan.

History
The post office building was originally established on 1 April 1907 as Chiayi branch 28 post office of Chunghwa Post.

Architecture
The post office is a 3-story building built with traditional Chinese architectural style. The building exterior walls depict Alishan cultural symbols.

See also
 List of tourist attractions in Taiwan

References

External links

  

1907 establishments in Taiwan
Buildings and structures in Chiayi County
Post office buildings in Taiwan
Tourist attractions in Chiayi County